Social justice is a political philosophy that values equality and solidarity

Social justice may also refer to:

 Social Justice Party (disambiguation), various organizations
 Social Justice (periodical), periodical published in the U.S. In the 1930s and 1940s
 Social Justice (political party), Israeli political party
 Social Justice (journal), academic journal